The Congress of Micronesia was a bicameral legislature in Trust Territory of the Pacific Islands from 1964 to 1979.

History

The Congress was established  on 28 September 1964, when the US Secretary of the Interior Stewart Udall issued order no. 2882. It replaced the previous Council of Micronesia, which had been based outside the Trust Territory in Guam. The first elections were held in January 1965.

The Congress was initially composed of a House of Delegates and General Assembly, which were later renamed the Senate and House of Representatives. The Congress building was burnt down in an arson attack on 20 February 1970.

Composition
The Senate had 12 members, two from each of the six districts. The House of Representatives had 21 members, with seats apportioned to each district based on their population – five from Truk, four from the Marshall Islands and Ponape, three from the Mariana Islands and Palau and two from Yap.

Elections were held every two years. Senators served four-year terms, with one Senator elected from each district at each election. All members of the House of Representatives were elected at each election.

Presidents of the upper chamber
The upper chamber of Congress of Micronesia was called House of Delegates, and later Senate.

Speakers of the lower chamber
The lower chamber of Congress of Micronesia was called House of Representatives.

Elections
1965 Trust Territory of the Pacific Islands parliamentary election
1966 Trust Territory of the Pacific Islands parliamentary election
1968 Trust Territory of the Pacific Islands parliamentary election
1970 Trust Territory of the Pacific Islands parliamentary election
1972 Trust Territory of the Pacific Islands parliamentary election
1974 Trust Territory of the Pacific Islands parliamentary election
1976 Trust Territory of the Pacific Islands parliamentary election

See also
Congress of the Federated States of Micronesia
Legislature of the Marshall Islands
Palau National Congress
List of legislatures by country

References

Trust Territory of the Pacific Islands
History of the Federated States of Micronesia
History of Palau
History of the Marshall Islands
Trust Territory of Pacific Islands
Trust Territory of Pacific Islands
1964 establishments in the Trust Territory of the Pacific Islands
1979 disestablishments in the Trust Territory of the Pacific Islands